The Cambodia national football team represents Cambodia in association football and is administered by the Football Federation of Cambodia (FFC). Operated under the name Khmer Republic from 1970 to 1975, it was founded in 1933 and joined FIFA's ranks in 1953.

History
It returned internationally and its first tournament was the Tiger Cup, in which it was defeated in all 4 matches. It participated in the 1998 World Cup qualification and got eliminated in the bottom of a group. It withdrew from participating in the 2006 World Cup qualification. It participated in the 2000 AFC Asian Cup qualification, before withdrew from 2004 and 2007 qualification attempts. 

Following its failure to qualify for the 2019 AFC Asian Cup, it participated in the 2022 FIFA World Cup qualification first round where it beat Pakistan in both games 4–1 on aggregate to reach the second round where it obtained a 1–1 draw at home to Hong Kong, before receiving defeats in the remaining games against Hong Kong, Bahrain, Iraq and Iran.

Kit
Before May 27, 2022, the home kit was a blue and black shirt with black shorts and blue socks; while the original away kit was all white with a series of horizontal red stripes on the shirt. FBT sponsored this version of the kit.

On May 27, 2022, the team announced its new kit collection. The Khmer sportswear company Varaman established in February 2022 sponsored them with designs by HCD football agency Clan United. The designs are based upon the flag of Cambodia, with the blue and red tones from the flag featured along with a pattern made from pixelated images of Angkor Wat. The 2022 home shirt uses a 3 toned blue digital camouflage design. The away shirt is all white fabric, with a zoomed in section of the pattern decorated in faint blue and red tones whilst being separated by patterns and shapes. To match each set, the goalkeeper kits are red and blue for home and away respectively. The repeated element is "slightly off-coloured" from the base fabric. The training kits are blue, red, and white with a graffiti styled pattern on each.

Stadium
The Morodok Techo National Sports Complex, with a capacity of 75,000, and associated facilities, was anticipated to be used to facilitate international friendly matches and regional qualifiers.

Fixtures

Matches in the last 12 months, and future scheduled matches

2023

Coaching staff

Coaching history
Updated 17 June 2022, after the match against .

Squad
The following players were selected for the 2022 AFF Championship.

Caps and goals updated as of 3 January 2023, after the match against Thailand.

|-
! colspan="9"  style="background:navy; text-align:left;"|
|- style="background:#dfedfd;"

|-
! colspan="9"  style="background:navy; text-align:left;"|
|- style="background:#dfedfd;"

|-
! colspan="9"  style="background:navy; text-align:left;"|
|- style="background:#dfedfd;"

Recent call-ups
The following players have been called up within the last 12 months.

INJ Withdrew due to injury
PRE Preliminary squad / standby
RET Retired from the national team
SUS Serving suspension
WD Withdrew due to non-injury issue.

Previous squads

AFC Asian Cup
 1972 AFC Asian Cup squad

AFF Championship
 1996 AFF Championship squad
 2000 AFF Championship squad
 2002 AFF Championship squad
 2004 AFF Championship squad
 2008 AFF Championship squad
 2016 AFF Championship squad
 2018 AFF Championship squad
 2020 AFF Championship squad
 2022 AFF Championship squad

Players record

Players in bold are still active with Cambodia.

Most appearances

Top goalscorers

Competition history

FIFA World Cup

AFC Asian Cup

AFC Challenge Cup

AFF Championship

Other
  President's Cup Tournament
 Champions: 1973
  South Vietnam Independence Cup
 Champions: 1972
  Jakarta Anniversary Tournament
 Third place: 1972

Head-to-head record
Last match updated was against  on 2 January 2023

Including results from  Khmer Republic.

1 includes the results of 
3 includes the results of

References

External links

 FIFA profile
 ELO records

Asian national association football teams
 
1933 establishments in Cambodia